The dollar coin is a United States coin with a face value of one United States dollar. Dollar coins have been minted in the United States in gold, silver, and base metal versions. Dollar coins were first minted  in the United States in 1794.

While true gold dollars are no longer minted, the Sacagawea, Presidential, and American Innovation dollars are sometimes referred to as golden dollars because of their color. As with several other denominations of U.S. coinage, golden dollars are similar in diameter and color to their Canadian counterpart (known as the "loonie," which predates the Sacagawea dollar by thirteen years). However, unlike the 11-sided Canadian dollar coins, U.S. "golden dollar" coins are round.

Dollar coins have never been popular in circulation since inception. Despite efforts by the government to promote their use to save the cost of printing one-dollar bills, such as the Presidential $1 Coin Program, most Americans currently use the bill. For this reason, since December 11, 2011, the Mint has not produced dollar coins for general circulation, and all dollar coins produced after that date have been specifically for collectors.  These collector coins can be ordered directly from the Mint, while pre-2012 circulation dollars can be obtained from most U.S. banks.

Popularity 
One-dollar coins, both in silver and base-metal forms, have never been popular in circulation from the 19th century to the present, despite several attempts to increase their usage since the 1970s, for various reasons:
 From 1792 to 1803 the $1 coin compared favorably with the Spanish dollar and was accepted at par for overseas purchases. Its coinage was suspended in 1803 since it did not remain long in domestic circulation.
 During the 1850s California gold rush the silver dollar of 371.25 grains was internationally worth more than the gold dollar of 23.22 grains and was therefore exported. Likewise, the gold dollar of 1849–1889 was a tiny coin measuring only  in diameter, making it difficult to grasp and easy to lose, a serious problem when a dollar was almost a day's wage.
 While substantial numbers of silver Morgan dollars were minted from 1878 pursuant to the Bland-Allison Act, there also existed an option to hold silver certificates fully backed by silver dollars kept in reserves. The majority of citizens, therefore, opted to use silver certificates while silver dollars languished inside vaults.

Succeeding base-metal $1 coins minted from 1971 onwards did not circulate widely as well, the most important reason being the continued circulation of the $1 bill.
 The copper-nickel Eisenhower dollar minted from 1971 to 1978 was not popular due to its large size relative to its gradually diminishing value;
 The smaller-sized Susan B. Anthony dollar coin introduced in 1979 was highly unpopular because they were often mistaken for quarters, due to their nearly equal size, their milled edge, and their similar color;
 Sacagawea dollars and Presidential dollar coins have been issued since 2000 with the various issues of the Anthony dollar coin rectified in terms of its distinct weight, gold color, and smooth edge. Despite these remedies, golden dollars rarely circulate as well since the $1 bill continues to be produced.

The non-acceptance of $1 coins in the United States contrasts with the practice in most other developed countries where denominations of similar value exist only in coins. These coins have largely succeeded because of a removal (or lack) of their corresponding paper issues, whereas the U.S. government has taken no action to remove the $1 bill. The Federal Reserve has refused to order the coin from the mint for distribution citing a lack of demand, according to ex-Mint director Philip Diehl in November 2012.

Whatever the reason, a U.S. Mint official claimed in a November 2012 meeting that most of the 2.4 billion dollar coins minted in the previous five years were not in circulation.

Mint marks 
The list below is of all mint marks used on the dollar coin:
C: Charlotte, North Carolina (gold coins only; 1838–1861).
CC: Carson City, Nevada (1870–1893).
D: Dahlonega, Georgia (gold coins only; 1838–1861).
D: Denver, Colorado (1906 to date).
O: New Orleans, Louisiana (1838–1861; 1879–1909).
P: Philadelphia, Pennsylvania (produced from 1793 to date, mint mark introduced in 1979).
S: San Francisco, California (1854 to date).
W: West Point, New York (1984 to date).

History

Early dollar coins 

Before the American Revolutionary War, coins from many European nations circulated freely in the American colonies, as did coinage issued by the various colonies. Chief among these were the Spanish silver dollar coins (also called pieces of eight or eight reales) minted in Mexico and other colonies with silver mined from Central and South American mines. These coins, along with others of similar size and value, were in use throughout the colonies, and later the United States, and were legal tender until 1857.

In 1776, several thousand pewter Continental Currency coins were minted.  Although unconfirmed, many numismatists believe these to have been pattern coins of a proposed silver dollar coin authorized by the Continental Congress to prop up the rapidly failing Continental Currency—the first attempt by the fledgling U.S. at paper currency.  Several examples were also struck in brass and silver, but a circulating coin was not produced, in large part because of the financial difficulties of running the Revolutionary War. The Continental Currency dollar coin bears the date 1776, and while its true denomination is not known, it is generally the size of later dollars, and the name has stuck. The failure of the Continental Currency exacerbated a distrust of paper money among both politicians and the population at large. The letters of Thomas Jefferson indicate that he wished the United States to eschew paper money and instead mint coins of similar perceived value and worth to those foreign coins circulating at the time.

The Coinage Act of 1792 authorized the production of dollar coins from silver. The United States Mint produced silver dollar coins from 1794 to 1803, then ceased regular production of silver dollars until 1836. The first silver dollars, precisely 1,758 of them, were coined on October 15, 1794, and were immediately delivered to Mint Director David Rittenhouse for distribution to dignitaries as souvenirs. Thereafter, until 1804, they were struck in varying quantities. There are two obverse designs: Flowing Hair (1794–1795) and Draped Bust (1795–1804). There are also two reverse designs used for the Draped Bust variety: small eagle (1795–1798) and heraldic eagle (1798–1804). Original silver dollars from this period are highly prized by coin collectors and are exceptionally valuable, and range from fairly common to incredibly rare. Because of the early practice of hand engraving each die, there are dozens of varieties known for all dates between 1795–1803.

It is also one of only two denominations (the other being the cent) minted every year from its inception during the first decade of mint operation.

The new US silver dollar of  therefore compared favorably and was received at par with the Spanish dollar for foreign payments, and in 1803 President Thomas Jefferson halted new silver dollars made out of the US Mint's limited resources since it failed to stay in domestic circulation. The less-exportable half dollar therefore became the largest US-made silver coin in domestic use for the next several decades. It was only after Mexican independence in 1821 when their peso's fine silver content of 377.1 grains was firmly upheld, which the US later had to compete with using a heavier Trade dollar coin of  fine silver.

The 1804 dollar 

The 1804 dollar is one of the rarest and most famous coins in the world. Its creation was the result of a simple bookkeeping error, but its status as a highly prized rarity has been established for nearly a century and a half. The silver dollars reported by the mint as being struck in 1804 were dated 1803. (With die steel being very expensive in the early 19th century, dies were used until they were no longer in working condition. This is why many early U.S. coins exhibit various kinds of die cracks, occlusions, cuds, clash marks, and other late-state die wear. Nearly every coin the U.S. struck from 1793 to 1825 has an example that was struck in a year other than that which it bears.) No dollars bearing the date 1804 were ever struck in 1804, though this was unknown to mint officials at the time the 1804 dollar came to be.

The 1804 silver dollar was actually produced in 1834, when the U.S. Department of State decided to produce a set of U.S. coins to be used as gifts to rulers in Asia in exchange for trade advantages. Since 1804 was the last recorded year of mintage for both the dollar and $10 Eagle, it was decided that the set would contain examples of those coins dated 1804, as well as the other denominations currently being produced. Mint officials, not realizing that the 19,000+ dollars recorded as being produced in 1804 were all dated 1803, proceeded to make new dies bearing the date 1804. Only 15 silver dollars with the date of 1804 are known to exist; in 1999, one of them sold at auction for more than $4 million. There are 8 Class I dollars, struck in 1834 for the aforementioned sets, 1 Class II dollar, struck over an 1857 Swiss Shooting Thaler (and now residing in the U.S. Coin Collection at the Smithsonian Institution), and 6 Class III dollars, struck surreptitiously sometime between 1858 and 1860 to meet collector demand for the coin.

Seated Liberty dollar (1836–1873) 

Seated Liberty dollars were introduced in 1836 and were minted in lesser quantities than the sparsely minted Gobrecht dollar that preceded it. The dollars were used in general circulation until 1873.  The production of large numbers of U.S. gold coins (The first $1 and $20 gold coins were minted in 1849) from the new California mines lowered the price of gold, thereby increasing the value of silver.  By 1853, the value of a U.S. silver dollar contained in gold terms, $1.04 of silver, equal to $ today. With the Mint Act of 1853, all U.S. silver coins, except for the U.S. silver dollar and new 3-cent coin, were reduced by 6.9% as of weight with arrows on the date to denote reduction.  The U.S. silver dollar continued to be minted in very small numbers mainly as a foreign trade coin with the Orient.

The international trading partners did not like the fact that U.S. coins were reduced in weight. The use of much more common half dollars became problematic since merchants would have to separate higher value pre-1853 coins from the newer reduced ones. From 1853 onward, trade with Asia was typically done with Mexican coins that kept their weight and purity in the 19th Century.   This ended in 1874 when the price of silver dropped so that a silver dollar had less than $1.00 worth of silver in it (because of huge amounts of silver coming from the Nevada Comstock Lode mines). By 1876, all silver coins were being used as money and by 1878, gold was at par with all U.S. paper dollars. Beginning in 1878, huge amounts of the Morgan silver dollars were produced but few were used as money. The size was too large to carry on business so Silver Certificates were used instead. The mint made the coins, placed them in their vaults, and issued the Silver Certificates instead. This is the reason so many Morgan and Peace dollars can be purchased in AU or UNC condition (near perfect) since they sat in bank or U.S. Treasury vaults most of the time.

Each Seated Liberty dollar is composed of 0.77344 troy oz of silver. They were minted at Philadelphia, New Orleans, Carson City, and San Francisco.

Gold dollar coins (1849–1889) 

The gold dollar was produced from 1849 to 1889.  1849 to 1853 gold dollar coins were 13 mm across and are called Type I.  Type II gold dollars were thinner but larger at 15 mm diameter and were produced from 1854 to 1855.  The most common gold dollar is the Type III, struck from 1856 until 1889.   Production of US $1 gold dollars was high until the Civil War and by 1863, only the larger value gold coins were produced in large quantities.  Most gold coins produced from 1863 and onward were produced for imports to pay for enormous amounts of war material and interest on some U.S. Government bonds.  Many of these coins from the Civil War and after (silver coins included) are in excellent condition since they saw very limited circulation with greenbacks and postage currency taking their place.

Composed of 90% pure gold, it was the smallest denomination of gold currency ever produced by the United States federal government.  When the U.S. system of coinage was originally designed there had been no plans for a gold dollar coin, but in the late 1840s, two gold rushes later, Congress was looking to expand the use of gold in the country's currency. The gold dollar was authorized by the Act of March 3, 1849, and the Liberty Head type began circulating soon afterward.  Because of the high value of gold, the gold dollar is the smallest coin in the history of U.S. coinage.

Trade dollar (1873–1885) 

The trade dollar was produced in response to other Western powers, such as Great Britain, Spain, France, and particularly Mexico, to compete with these trade coins for use in trade in Asia.
The American trade dollar therefore had to be made better, at 420 grains of 90% fine silver, fine content , or 0.44 g more fine silver than the regular circulation Seated Liberty Dollars and Morgan Dollars. Most trade dollars ended up in China during their first two years of production, where they were very successful. Many of them exhibit holes or chopmarks which are counterstamps from Asian merchants to verify the authenticity of the coins. Many trade coins of the western powers and large silver coins from China, Korea, and Japan also bear these chopmarks. While most chopmarked coins are generally worth less than those without, some of the more fascinating chopmarks can give the coin a modest premium.

Things changed, however, in 1876, when the price of silver spiraled downward as western producers dumped silver on the market, making the trade dollar worth more at face value than its silver content. This prompted Congress to revoke their legal tender status, and restrict their coinage to exportation demand only.

Production of the trade dollar was officially discontinued for business strikes in 1878, and thereafter from 1879–1885, produced only as proof examples of the coin. The issues of 1884 and 1885 were produced surreptitiously and were unknown to the collecting public until 1908.

Morgan dollar (1878–1904, 1921, 2021-present) 

Morgan silver dollars, all composed of 90% silver and 10% copper (slightly less silver than sterling silver, 92.5%) containing 26.73g = 0.8595 oz t of pure silver, were struck between 1878 and 1904, with a minting in 1921 and a commemorative minting in 2021. The 1921-dated coins are the most common, and there exists a substantial collector market for pristine, uncirculated specimens of the rarer dates and mint marks. Morgan dollars are second only to Lincoln Cents in collector popularity. The coin is named after George T. Morgan, its designer. Morgan dollars were minted at Philadelphia (no mint mark), New Orleans ("O" mint mark), San Francisco ("S" mint mark), Carson City ("CC" mint mark), and (in 1921 only) Denver ("D" mint mark). The mint mark is found on the reverse below the wreath, above the "O" in "DOLLAR". Production of the Morgan Dollar began again in 2021 and US Mint officials announced an intention to continue producing them in 2022 and beyond.

Peace dollar (1921–1928, 1934–1935, 2021-present) 

Introduced in December 1921 and having the same ratio of silver-to-copper as the Morgan dollar, the Peace dollar, designed by medalist Anthony de Francisci, was promulgated to commemorate the signing of formal peace treaties between the Allied forces and Germany and Austria.  These treaties officially ended the Allies' World War I hostilities with these two countries. In 1922 the Mint made silver dollar production its top priority, causing other denominations to be produced sparingly if at all that year. Production ceased temporarily after 1928; original plans called for only a one-year suspension, but this was extended by the Great Depression. Mintage resumed in 1934, but for only two years.

In May 1965, 316,000+ Peace dollars were minted, all at the Denver Mint and dated 1964-D; however, plans for completing this coinage were abandoned, and most of those already minted were melted, with two known trial strike specimens being preserved (for assay purposes) until 1970, when they too were melted, and none released either for circulation or collection purposes. It is rumored that one or more pieces still exist, most notably any examples obtained by key members of Congress, the president, or mint officials. However, this coin, much like the 1933 $20 gold double eagle (aside from the "exception", sold in 2002 for over $7 million and the 10 found later), is illegal to own and would be subject to confiscation.

Minting of the Peace Dollar began again in 2021. US Mint officials have announced an intention to continue minting Peace Dollars in 2022 and beyond.

Release of dollars by the U.S. Treasury: the GSA sale 

Because of the size and weight of the dollar coins, they circulated minimally throughout their history, except in the West (especially at casinos in the early-to-mid-20th century, where they were commonly used both at the tables and at slot machines.) As a result, the coins were generally shipped to Washington and stored in the vaults of the U.S. Treasury; at times these stores numbered into the hundreds of millions.

They were very popular as Christmas gifts, however, and from the 1930s to the early 1960s, many bags were annually released to banks nationwide to be distributed as presents. In November 1962, during this annual distribution, it was discovered that there were some rare and valuable dates, still sealed in their original mint bags, all in uncirculated condition, among the millions of dollar coins still in the Treasury vaults. Collectors/investors/dealers lined up to purchase them in $1,000 bags, trading silver certificates for the coins. Before this event, the great rarity of the Morgan series was 1903-O, which was by far the most expensive of the entire set. It was discovered that there were millions of this specific date and mint in the Treasury vaults; an estimated 84% of the entire mintage sat in these bags, untouched for 60 years, all in uncirculated condition. While still relatively expensive in circulated grades, uncirculated examples can be had for a modest amount over common dates.

On March 25, 1964, Secretary of the Treasury C. Douglas Dillon announced that Silver Certificates would no longer be redeemable for silver dollars. Subsequently, another act of Congress dated June 24, 1967, provided that Silver Certificates could be exchanged for silver bullion for a period of one year, until June 24, 1968.

Following this, the Treasury inventoried its remaining stock of dollar coins and found approximately 3,000 bags containing 3 million coins. Many of the remaining coins were Carson City mint dollars, which even then carried a premium.  The coins were placed in special hard plastic holders and the General Services Administration (GSA) was given authorization to sell them to the public in a series of mail-bid sales. Five sales were conducted in 1973 and 1974, but sales were poor, and the results unspectacular. There was much complaining among the coin-buying public, many stating that the United States government should not be in the "coin business", especially considering that the government had spent little more than a dollar to mint and store each coin. After these sales, more than a million coins were still left unsold.

These sat again until 1979–1980, where, amidst an extraordinarily volatile precious metals market (the attempt by the 3 Hunt brothers to corner the silver market), the remaining coins were sold under chaotic conditions. The GSA, having published minimum bids in November 1979, announced on January 2, 1980, that those minimum bids were no longer valid, and that prospective bidders would have to "call in" to a toll-free number to get current minimum bids. Then, on February 21, 13 days after the bidding process officially began, the maximum number of coins per bidder was changed from 500 to 35. Many bidders, under these confusing conditions, ended up with no coins at all. Complaints again flooded into Congress, but the damage had already been done, and the last silver dollars held by the United States Treasury were gone.

Over the years, many of these GSA dollars have been broken out of their special holders for purposes of grading or otherwise, and now GSA dollars still in the unbroken original holders carry a small premium. Some third-party grading companies have begun to grade coins still in their GSA holders, as a means of preservation, though this is not without controversy.

Eisenhower dollar (1971–1978) 

From 1971 to 1978, the U.S. Mint issued dollar coins with the obverse depicting President Dwight David Eisenhower  and the reverse the insignia of the Apollo 11 Moon landing, both designed by Chief Engraver Frank Gasparro. The 1976 Bicentennial commemorative design, produced in 1975 and 1976, featured the Liberty Bell and the Moon on the reverse (designed by Dennis R. Williams) while retaining the Eisenhower obverse, and the dual dates 1776–1976. The Eisenhower dollars minted for general circulation contained no silver or gold but were instead composed of the same copper-nickel clad composition used for the dime, quarter, and half dollar.  This made the circulation coins extremely resistant to wear and, like the smaller denominations, they still retain a good deal of shine even when subject to mass usage.

From 1971 through 1976, the Mint also produced dollars composed of 40% silver aimed at the collector market. The 1971–1974 issues appeared in brown boxes or blue packages, depending on whether they were proof or uncirculated. Somewhat different Bicentennial sets were produced in the following two years. All issues remain very common.

The coins were never very popular, primarily because of their large size and weight which made them inconvenient to carry, and the fact that very few vending machines were designed to accept them. They saw the greatest use in casinos, and one-dollar tokens in many United States casinos still approximate the size and weight of the coins.  Prior to the withdrawal of the coins, which remain legal tender (and are sometimes available at banks by request), many casinos did not strike their own tokens, but instead used the Eisenhower dollar.

Susan B. Anthony dollar (1979–1981; 1999) 

From 1979 to 1981, and again in 1999, the Mint produced Anthony Dollars depicting women's suffrage activist Susan B. Anthony (also designed by Frank Gasparro). Anthony thus became the first historical female person portrayed on circulating U.S. coinage. Many earlier circulating coins had featured images of women via allegorical figures such as Peace or Liberty; Spain's Queen Isabella appeared on the 1893 Columbian Exposition quarter dollar but the coin was not intended for general circulation. The Anthony dollars, like the Eisenhower dollars, were made from a copper-nickel clad. The 1981 coins were issued for collectors only but occasionally show up in circulation.

The Anthony dollar, because of its color, size, and design, was often confused with the quarter. It was never popular and production was suspended after 1981. In 1999, it was struck again when Treasury reserves of the coin were low and the Sacagawea dollar was still a year away from production.  While reserves of the coins were high, the coins were most often seen in vending machines, transit systems, and post offices.

American Silver Eagle (1986–present) 

The American Silver Eagle is the official silver bullion coin of the United States. It was designed by Adolph A. Weinman and John Mercanti and it was first released by the United States Mint on November 24, 1986. It is struck only in the one troy ounce size, which has a nominal face value of one dollar and is guaranteed to contain one troy ounce of 99.9% pure silver. It is authorized by Title II of Public Law 99-61 (Liberty Coin Act, approved July 9, 1985) and codified as (e)-(h). Its content, weight, and purity are certified by the United States Mint. In addition to the bullion version, the United States Mint has produced a proof version and an uncirculated version for coin collectors. The Silver Eagle has been produced at three mints: the Philadelphia Mint, the San Francisco Mint, and the West Point Mint. The American Silver Eagle bullion coin may be used to fund Individual Retirement Account investments.

Sacagawea dollar (2000–present) 

The Sacagawea dollar was authorized by Congress in 1997 because the supply of Anthony dollars, in inventory since their last mintage in 1981, was soon expected to be depleted. These coins have a copper core clad by manganese brass. Delays in increasing Sacagawea dollar production led to a final 1999-dated mintage of Susan B. Anthony dollars. Dollar coins are used infrequently in general commerce. They used to be given as change by United States Postal Service (USPS) stamp vending machines, which created a relatively small but significant demand, but the USPS eliminated all those machines by 2011.  They were also used in certain subway and public transit systems, such as the "T" in Boston and New York City Subway ticketing machines.

In 1998, the U.S. Mint conducted a limited design competition for the new dollar, inviting 23 artists to submit designs portraying Sacagawea on the obverse ("heads") side and American bald eagle on the reverse ("tails") side. In November 1998, an exhibit of 123 submitted designs was held at the Casa Italiana Hall in Washington, D.C. to solicit public and private comment. Design concepts were submitted in the form of drawings, renderings, sculpture, and die-struck prototypes.

The obverse was designed by artist Glenna Goodacre. Since no verifiable image of Sacagawea exists, Goodacre used Randy'L He-dow Teton, a University of New Mexico college student and a Shoshone Indian, as a model for the coin.

There are approximately 1 billion Sacagawea coins in circulation and about 250 million in reserve. The U.S. Mint greatly reduced production of Sacagawea dollars after the 2001 minting, citing sufficient inventory.  From 2002 to 2008, the Sacagawea dollar was still minted for collectors and was available in uncirculated rolls, mint sets, and proof sets, but it was not released for general circulation again until the introduction of the Native American series in 2009.

The Mint took great care to create the coin with the same size, weight, and electromagnetic properties as the Anthony dollar, but with a golden color. Unlike most other coins in circulation, the selected alloy has a tendency to tarnish quite severely in circulation, as is the case with most brasses, resulting in a loss of the golden shine, except on raised areas where the "patina" is more frequently rubbed off. While some consider the blackening an undesired quality, the Mint suggests the uneven tarnishing effect gives the coins an "antique finish" that "accentuate[s] the profile and add[s] a dimension of depth to the depiction of Sacagawea and her child".

The coin featured a plain edge through 2008, but starting in 2009, incused lettering was applied. The year and mint mark moved from the coin's obverse (front) to its edge.

, dollar coins are not widely encountered in U.S. commerce, except in vending machines for rides on mass transit, some pay and display machines, some laundromats, and old-fashioned slot machines. On the other hand, the Sacagawea dollar has achieved popularity in El Salvador, Ecuador, and Panama, where the U.S. dollar is also the official currency.

Native American series 

With the passage of the Native American $1 Coin Act on September 20, 2007, the U.S. Mint began designing a series of Sacagawea dollars with modified reverses to further commemorate "Native Americans and the important contributions made by Indian tribes and individual Native Americans to the development of the United States and the history of the United States". Four designs were to be minted, each for one year from 2009 to 2012. The first Native American series coin was released in January 2009 and had a reverse that depicted a Native American woman sowing seeds of the Three Sisters, symbolizing the Indian tribes' contributions to agriculture.

Like the Presidential Dollar, the year of issue, mint mark, and motto E Pluribus Unum are found on the edge of the coin instead of on the obverse or reverse, which allows for more room for the design. Unlike the Presidential $1 coins from before 2009, "In God We Trust" remains on the obverse and the vacant space on the edge lettering has been taken up by thirteen stars, symbolizing the Thirteen Colonies. Also, unlike any other denomination of circulating U.S. coinage (but in common with the Presidential $1 coins), the value is inscribed in numerals on the reverse. The act passed by Congress requires that 20% of the total dollar coins minted in any year during the Presidential $1 Coin Program be Sacagawea dollars bearing the new design.

In January 2010, the second reverse design in the series was released which has the theme of "Government" and the "Great Tree of Peace". The 2010 Sacagawea reverse depicts the Hiawatha Belt and five arrows bound together representing unity with the inscription "Haudenosaunee", a synonym for the Iroquois Confederacy meaning "People of the Longhouse". Another inscription is found along the lower edge of the reverse spelling "Great Law of Peace" (an English translation of Gayanashagowa, the Iroquois Confederacy constitution). The Great Law of Peace was used as a model for the Constitution of the United States. The four links on the belt are meant to symbolize four of the five Nations of the Iroquois Confederacy, namely the Mohawk, Oneida, Cayuga and Seneca Nations. The Eastern White Pine tree in the middle of the belt represents the fifth Nation, the Onondaga, and is a depiction of the Tree of Peace.

Presidential Dollar Coins (2007–2016; 2020) 

In December 2005, Congress decided to create a new series of $1 coins that would honor the former U.S. presidents. In 2007, Presidential coins of four different designs were produced. Another four designs will be produced each year, honoring the presidents in order of service. (Grover Cleveland is on two coins, since he served two non-consecutive terms.)  The Presidential $1 Coin Act is intended to create renewed interest in dollar coins, like that seen during the 50 State Quarters program. At least one-third of all dollar coins produced are still Sacagawea coins, with the remaining coins making up the four presidential coins annually. Under federal law, no coins may be issued featuring a living president, or a president who died less than two years earlier.

The presidential dollar coin is the same size and composition as the Sacagawea dollar. "In God We Trust", the issue year, and the mint mark appear on the edge. The first dollar, honoring George Washington, was released into circulation on February 15, 2007.
However,  became law on December 26, 2007, which moved "In God We Trust" from the edge to the obverse.

A common minting error on this coin, estimated at 80,000, from a mintage of 300,000,000 coins, is the omission of the edge lettering causing a plain outside edge.  Because the omission includes the words "In God We Trust", some in the popular media have dubbed it the "godless" coin.  A false (although at one time widely reported) error is the report that the edge lettering is upside down.  The edge lettering does not occur at the same time as the minting of the coins, allowing for the natural occurrence of the lettering in either orientation, except Proof Coins where the date and lettering are all "right-side-up".

Because of budget constraints and increasing stockpiles of these relatively unpopular coins, the production of new Presidential dollar coins for circulation was suspended on December 11, 2011, by U.S. Treasury Secretary Timothy F. Geithner. Further minting of these coins was reserved solely for collectors.

American Innovation Dollar Coins (2018–2032)

On July 20, 2018, then-President Donald Trump signed the American Innovation $1 Coin Act into law. The program calls for the release of four new coins each year from 2019 through 2032 "to honor innovation and innovators by issuing $1 coins for each of the 50 states, the District of Columbia, and the five U.S. territories – Puerto Rico, Guam, American Samoa, the U.S. Virgin Islands, and the Northern Mariana Islands". An introductory coin, commemorating George Washington signing the country's first patent into law, was released in December 2018. The coins are currently only being minted for collectors.

Designs 

 Silver dollar coins
 Flowing Hair dollar 1794–1795
 Draped Bust dollar 1795–1803
 Draped Bust, Small Eagle 1795–1798
 Draped Bust, Heraldic Eagle 1798–1803, 1804 (not a regular issue)
 Gobrecht dollar 1836–1839
 Seated Liberty dollar 1840–1873
 Seated Liberty, no motto 1840–1865
 Seated Liberty, with motto 1866–1873
 Trade dollar 1873–1878 (Business & Proofs struck), 1879–1885 (Proofs only)
 Morgan dollar 1878–1904, 1921
 Peace dollar 1921–1935
 Peace dollar (high relief) 1921
 Peace dollar (low relief) 1922–1928, 1934–1935
American Silver Eagle 1986–present

 Gold dollar coins
 Liberty Head (Small Size) 1849–1854
 Indian Head (Large Size) 1854–1889
 Small Indian Head 1854–1856
 Large Indian Head 1856–1889

 Copper-nickel clad dollar coins
 Eisenhower dollar 1971–1974, 1977–1978
 Eisenhower Bicentennial 1975–1976 (all dated 1976)
 Susan B. Anthony dollar 1979–1981, 1999

 Manganese brass "golden" dollar coins
 Sacagawea dollar (eagle reverse) 2000–2008
 Sacagawea dollar (Native American series) 2009–present
 Presidential dollar coins 2007–2016, 2020
 American Innovation dollars 2018–2032

See also 

 United States $1 Coin Act of 1997
 Modern United States commemorative coins
 United States Mint coin production

References

Further reading 
 The Comprehensive U. S. Silver Dollar Encyclopedia by John W. Highfill,  
 Comprehensive Catalog and Encyclopedia of Morgan and Peace Dollars, 
 Financial Impact of Issuing the New $1 Coin , GAO/GGD-00-111R, April 7, 2000.
 New coin unlikely change?, Steve Cranford, Charlotte Business Journal, July 21, 2000.

External links 

 Exhibition: Legendary Coins & Currency (National Museum of American History)
 Comprehensive United States coin reference
 United States Dollar Coins, Varieties and Reference
 United States Small Size Dollar Coins, 1979–present
 United States Mint

United States dollar coins